Hertford is the county town of Hertfordshire, England, and is also a civil parish in the East Hertfordshire district of the county. The parish had a population of 26,783 at the 2011 census.

The town grew around a ford on the River Lea, near its confluences with the rivers Mimram, Beane, and Rib. The Lea is navigable from the Thames up to Hertford. Fortified settlements were established on each side of the ford at Hertford in 913AD. The county of Hertfordshire was established at a similar time, being named after and administered from Hertford. Hertford Castle was built shortly after the Norman Conquest in 1066 and remained a royal residence until the early seventeenth century.

Hertfordshire County Council and East Hertfordshire District Council both have their main offices in the town and are major local employers, as is McMullen's Brewery, which has been based in the town since 1827.

Toponymy

History

One possible earlier mention of the town was in 672 AD: the first synod of a number of the bishops in England was held either in Hertford or at Hartford, Cambridgeshire. The synod was called by Theodore of Tarsus; decisions included the calculation of the date of Easter.

The Anglo-Saxon Chronicle records that in 913AD, Edward the Elder ordered the construction of two burhs (earthwork fortifications) either side of the ford over the River Lea at Hertford as part of his campaign against the Danes.

By the time of the Domesday Book, Hertford had two churches, two markets and three mills. The Normans began work on Hertford Castle, and Hertford Priory was founded by Ralph de Limesy. King Henry II rebuilt the castle in stone, but in 1216, during the First Barons' War, it was besieged and captured after 25 days by Prince Louis of France. The castle was regularly visited by English royalty and in 1358, Queen Isabella, wife of Edward II, died there. The priory was dissolved in 1536 and subsequently demolished and in 1563, the Parliament of England met at the castle because of an outbreak of plague in London. Hertford grew and prospered as a market and county town; communication was improved by the construction of the Lea Navigation Canal in 1767 and the arrival of the railway in 1843. The Port Hill drill hall was completed in 1898 and Yeomanry House was brought into military use in 1910.

Governance
Hertford has three tiers of local government at parish (town), district, and county level: Hertford Town Council, East Hertfordshire District Council, and Hertfordshire County Council, all three of which are based in the town.

Hertford has been the county town of Hertfordshire since the county was founded in Saxon times. The town also gave its name to the hundred of Hertford. The town was initially governed by the king's reeves. By the thirteenth century, the reeves had been replaced by a bailiff, elected by the burgesses. Charters of 1554 and 1589 established a common council of eleven chief burgesses and a bailiff. Another charter of 1605 changed the bailiff's title to mayor. Under the Municipal Corporations Act 1835, Hertford became a Municipal borough; the ratepayers elected twelve councillors, who chose four aldermen, with the aldermen and councillors together composing the council (also known as the corporation), which elected the mayor.

The Hertford poor law union was established in 1835, covering the town and surrounding rural parishes.

Hertford Corporation used part of the Shire Hall as a Town Hall until 1911, when it moved into the surviving gatehouse of Hertford Castle.

Under the Local Government Act 1972, Hertford Municipal Borough was abolished, merging with other districts to become part of the district of East Hertfordshire with effect from 1 April 1974. A successor parish was created covering the former borough of Hertford, with its parish council taking the name Hertford Town Council. The town council is based at the former offices of the borough corporation at Hertford Castle.

The headquarters of Hertfordshire County Council is at County Hall, built in 1939 to replace the Shire Hall. East Hertfordshire District Council's offices almost adjoin County Hall, being at Wallfields, which prior to 1974 had been the offices of Hertford Rural District Council.

Arms
From at least 1634, Hertford Corporation used an escutcheon (shield) depicting a hart above water to indicate a ford. The borough council was granted the right to complement its arms with a badge in 1925, and supporters were added in 1937. The coat of arms is now used by Hertford Town Council.

Geography
Hertford is at the confluence of four river valleys: the Rib, Beane and Mimram join the River Lea at Hertford to flow east and then south toward the Thames as the Lee Navigation, after Hertford Castle Weir. The shared valley of the Lea and the Beane is called Hartham Common and this provides a large park to one side of the town centre running towards Ware and lying below the ridge upon which Bengeo is situated.

The town centre still has its medieval layout with many timber-framed buildings hidden under later frontages, particularly in St Andrew Street. Hertford suffers from traffic problems despite the existence of the 1960s A414 bypass called Gascoyne Way which passes close to the town centre. Plans have long existed to connect the A10 with the A414, by-passing the town completely. This is aided by its proximity to larger towns such as Harlow, Bishop's Stortford and Stevenage where modern development has been focused.   
Suburbs and estates
 Bengeo
 Foxholes Estate
 Horns Mill
 Pinehurst, Hertford
 Rush Green
 Sele Farm

Nearby Hertford
 Hertford Heath
 Hertingfordbury
 Waterford

Economy

A fair amount of employment in the town is centred on County Hall (Hertfordshire County Council), Wallfields (East Hertfordshire District Council) and McMullens Brewery, one of a dwindling number of independent pre-1970 family brewers in the United Kingdom. Many residents commute to work in London.

Hertford differs from neighbouring towns as it lacks a modern shopping development (mall). However, it has most of the usual supermarkets. A Tesco store occupies part of the former Christ's Hospital Bluecoat Girls School, which closed down in 1985. Sainsbury's opened a new store on part of the McMullens Brewery site in June 2012. A Waitrose occupied a reasonably large store in the Bircherley Green Shopping area that closed on 12 September 2017. The local branch of Woolworths closed for good on 27 December 2008, after the collapse of that store chain. There are fewer of the usual chain shops found in most high streets and this makes Hertford stand out from other "clone towns". There are a high number of independent shops in the town, with a variety of boutiques and salons.

Sport and leisure
Hertford has a leisure centre and swimming pool, skatepark,  bowling green and tennis courts on Hartham Common.

Football 
There is a Non-League football club Hertford Town F.C., which plays at Hertingfordbury Park. Hertford Town Youth FC, a FA Charter Standard Football Club, play at County Hall Playing Fields, situated next to the headquarters of Hertfordshire County Council at County Hall in Hertford. Other clubs surrounding the town include Bury Rangers, Hertford Heath Youth FC and Bengeo Tigers Football Club (an award-winning FA Charter Standard Community Football Club.)

Cricket

Hertford Cricket Club is an English amateur cricket club, located in Hertford, the county town of Hertfordshire. Cricket records for a Hertford club go back a far as 1825, however the club in its present form has been in existence since 1860. The club plays its matches at Balls park, Hertford. Currently the club runs five teams and all the teams play in the local league.

People
 Frederick Scott Archer (1813 – 1857), son of a Hertford butcher, was an early photographer best known for having invented the photographic collodion process
  The band Deep Purple formed in Hertford in 1968.
 Alfred Russel Wallace who proposed a theory of natural selection at the same time as Charles Darwin lived in Hertford from ages five to thirteen and attended Hertford Grammar School.
 John Wilkes, the radical politician, was educated in Hertford.
 Sergeant Alfred Alexander Burt VC, soldier in the Hertfordshire Regiment who was born and lived in Hertford. He was awarded the Victoria Cross for his valour on 27 September 1915 during the Battle of Loos.
 Captain W E Johns, Writer of the Biggles books was born in Bengeo, attended Hertford Grammar School and lived in Hertford.

 Samuel Stone, Puritan minister who established the American town of Hartford, Connecticut with Thomas Hooker. He lived in Fore Street, Hertford and was baptised at All Saints Church. There is a statue commemorating him, close to the Hertford Theatre.
 Jane Wenham was tried at the Hertford Assizes for witchcraft in 1712. The jury found her guilty, one of the last in England to be convicted of this offence. Judge Powell had no choice but to condemn her to death, but through his influence she was later given a Royal Pardon.
 Jack Trevor Story, the author of "The Trouble with Harry" and other works, was born in Hertford in 1917.
 Actor Rupert Grint comes from Hertford, and although he now lives outside the town, he lived within Hertford when he began filming for the Harry Potter film series. He attended Richard Hale School until finishing his GCSE exams in 2004. Other famous former pupils of Richard Hale School are listed on the school's page.
 Dani Filth, singer of Cradle of Filth was born in Hertford, but grew up in Ipswich.
 Singer George Ezra was born and grew up in Hertford, attending Simon Balle School.
 International rugby union players Robbie Morris & Jamie George.
 Cricketers Stuart Cradock, John Hughes and Lawrence Wright were born in Hertford.
 The Labour Party MP for Liverpool Walton between 1964 and 1984, Labour Chairman, government minister and shadow cabinet minister Eric Heffer was born in Hertford in 1922

Landmarks

 In the town are the remains of the original Hertford Castle, principally a motte. The castle's gatehouse, the central part of which dates to a rebuild by Edward IV in 1463, is the home to Hertford Town Council. The Motte, from the original Motte and Bailey castle in Hertford, can be found just behind Castle Hall, a short distance from the modern castle.
 There are several churches in the town, All Saints', and St Andrew's, are late and mid 19th century respectively, although both stand on the sites of medieval places of worship. In the northern suburb of Bengeo lies St Leonard's, a two-celled Norman church of considerable architectural interest.
 In Railway Street can be found the oldest purpose-built Quaker Meeting House in the world, in use since 1670.

 The Parliament of England temporarily moved to Hertford during a plague outbreak in London in 1563. This is why the main square in the town, Parliament Square, is so named, although it is a twentieth-century creation.
 The home of Alfred Russel Wallace (see above), now named Wallace House, can be found at 11 St. Andrew St. and is marked with a plaque.
 Built in 1779, the Shire Hall was designed by Robert Adam. The ground floor houses Court Rooms.
 The Hertford Corn Exchange was built on the site of a former gaol. After years in the doldrums it has now reverted to being a live entertainment venue.

 The Egyptian House in Fore Street, built c. 1824, is an early example of Egyptian revival architecture. It was a grocery store from the Victorian era until the 1960s, and is currently a restaurant.
 In Cowbridge, there is a Prince Albert Cottage. The first of these cottages was originally built in Hyde Park by the Society for Improving the Condition of the Labouring Classes in 1851 at the time of the Great Exhibition. Prince Albert was involved in their design and financing.
 Hertford Museum is housed in a 17th-century historic town house, with a Jacobean-style knot garden.
  A stained-glass window in St Andrew's Church is part of a fringe theory that links Hertford to the Knights Templar and the Holy Grail.

Transport

Rail

Two railway stations serve Hertford - Hertford East and Hertford North. Transport for London Oyster cards are valid for payment and travel at both stations.

Hertford East 

Hertford East is the north-western terminus of the Hertford East Branch Line.
Greater Anglia manages the station and operates trains between Hertford East and London Liverpool Street in the City of London.

The Hertford East Branch Line along with the West Anglia Main Line provide the town with direct connections to Ware, Broxbourne, Cheshunt, Waltham Cross, Tottenham Hale and Hackney Downs. At Broxbourne - the south-eastern terminus of the branch line - the West Anglia Main Line runs northbound towards Bishop's Stortford, Audley End and Cambridge.

Hertford North 

Hertford North is on the Hertford Loop Line, a branch of the East Coast Main Line.

Great Northern operates trains northbound towards Watton-at-Stone and Stevenage. Southbound, Great Northern trains run towards London Moorgate in the City through Enfield Chase, Alexandra Palace, Finsbury Park and Highbury and Islington. Some timetabled services run southbound into London King's Cross instead of Moorgate.

North of Stevenage, trains run towards Hitchin, Peterborough, the North and Scotland, and towards Letchworth, Royston and Cambridge. South of Finsbury Park, services run towards King's Cross, London St Pancras, Farringdon, Gatwick Airport and Brighton.

Road

The A10 runs north-south through the east of Hertford. Kingsmead Viaduct carries the A10 across the River Lea between Hertford and Ware. Southbound, the route runs towards the M25 London Orbital motorway and the City of London, through Cheshunt, Enfield and Tottenham. Northbound, the route runs towards King's Lynn in Norfolk via Buntingford, Royston, Cambridge and Ely.

The A414 runs east-west through Hertford, along Hertingfordbury Road, Gascoyne Way and London Road. The primary route runs eastbound towards the A10, Harlow, the M11 motorway, Chelmsford and Maldon. Westbound, the route carries traffic towards Hatfield, the A1(M) motorway, St Albans and Hemel Hempstead. 

The A119 runs eastbound from Hertford into Ware. The route runs northbound from Hertford towards Watton-at-Stone and the A602 for Stevenage.

Bus and coach
Hertford Bus Station lies to the east of Bircherley Street in Hertford town centre.

Long-distance routes through Hertford include:

 724 (Arriva Green Line) - Harlow (via Ware), or Heathrow Airport (via Welwyn Garden City, Hatfield, St Albans, Watford, Rickmansworth, Denham and Hillingdon)
 737 (National Express) - Stansted Airport (via Harlow), or Oxford (via Hatfield, Luton Airport, Luton and Milton Keynes)

Hertfordshire County Council manages the Intalink enhanced partnership which choreographs the local bus network. Bus routes in Hertford include:

 308/380 (Arriva) - Cuffley and Bayford
 310 (Arriva) - Waltham Cross (via Ware, Broxbourne and Cheshunt)
 324 (Arriva) - Ware, or Welwyn Garden City
 331 (Arriva) - Royston (via Ware, Puckeridge and Buntingford)
 333 (Central Connect) - Bengeo circular
 341/641 (Uno) - Broxbourne (via Ware and Hoddesdon), or Hatfield (via Essendon)
 351 (Central Connect) - Bishop's Stortford (via Much Hadham)
 378/379 (Arriva) - Stevenage (via Tewin and Datchworth)
 383/384 (Central Connect) - Stevenage (via Tonwell), or Ware
 390 (Arriva/Centrebus) - Stevenage, or Ware
 395 (Arriva) - Ware

Cycling 
National Cycle Route 61 runs east-west through Hertford. Between Welwyn Garden City and Ware, through Hertford, the route is also known as Cole Green Way. The route's western terminus is near Taplow in Berkshire, near Slough and Maidenhead. To the east, NCR61 meets NCR1 near Hoddesdon.

Hertford is the northern terminus of the Lee Navigation and the associated towpath, which carries NCR61 for part of its route. The towpath's southern terminus is in Limehouse, East London. The cycle route passes through Ware, Hoddesdon, Broxbourne, Enfield Lock, Tottenham, Leyton and Hackney Wick.

River
Hertford is the northern terminus of the navigable River Lea, which is managed by the Canal and River Trust. Southbound, the river runs towards Bromley-by-Bow in East London, through Ware, Hoddesdon, Broxbourne, Enfield Lock, Tottenham, Leyton and Hackney Wick. The river meets the navigable River Stort at Hoddesdon, which runs northbound through Harlow, Sawbridgeworth and Bishop's Stortford.

The Hertford Union Canal and the Limehouse Cut connect the Lee Navigation with the Regent's Canal in London.

Lee and Stort Boat Company runs a waterbus at various points throughout the year, with a route between Hertford and Ware.

Education
Schools in Hertford include the Sele School, Richard Hale School and Simon Balle All-through School at secondary level, with primaries of Hollybush JMI, Millmead Community School, Bengeo Primary School, Morgans Primary School & Nursery, Abel Smith School (named after banker and MP Abel Smith (1788–1859)), St Andrew's School, St. Josephs RC School and Wheatcroft School.

Private schools include St. Joseph's in the Park in Hertingfordbury, Duncombe School, (a preparatory school in Bengeo) and Haileybury College in Hertford Heath.

Pinewood and Middleton Schools are special needs schools that are available in neighbouring Ware.

Former schools include The Pines JMI school which was built on the Pinehurst estate in 1977 and closed in 2003.

Entertainment
Hertford Theatre, previously known as Castle Hall, is a modern theatre, cinema and art gallery complex at The Wash in the town centre. The Hertford Corn Exchange is a building where entertainment such as comedy and art exhibitions take place. Hertford has many food, drink and entertainment establishments which have grown in number considerably since the eighties and nineties. It attracts people from nearby towns, and often the North London suburbs. There are approximately 25 pubs and clubs in the area, and around 35 restaurants, takeaways and snack bars.
Hertford also benefits from public swimming pool and gym facilities and a small skatepark, all situated on Hartham Common.

Town twinning

  Évron, France
  Wildeshausen, Germany
  Hartford, Connecticut, United States

Notes

References

External links 

 Hertford Town Council
 Discover Hertford
 Theinsider.org
 
 History of Hertford Prison from theprison.org.uk

 
Towns in Hertfordshire
County towns in England
Civil parishes in Hertfordshire
East Hertfordshire District